Cadillac-Gage manufactures a Cadillac-Gage 1 metre turret for armored vehicles.
The turret mounts on a 1-meter turret ring.
They were originally armed with a 7.62 mm machine gun, and a 12.7 mm machine gun.  By 1984 a version of the turret was introduced where one of the machine guns was replaced by a Mark 19 automatic grenade launcher.  The gunner is surrounded by 8 large vision blocks, and has a periscope with a telescopic sight.

One variant of the Canadian AVGP mounts this turret.
When Canada made these older vehicle available to African Union peace-keeping forces in Sudan they had to seek permission from the United States Government in order to ship them with their turrets.

References 

Weapon fixtures